The University of Limerick Students' Union is the representative body for students at the University of Limerick (UL), situated primarily in Limerick, Ireland. The union also organises social activities, and supports a range of clubs and societies.

History
The National Institute for Higher Education (NIHE) was founded in Limerick in 1972. The 113 students who started in NIHEL that year founded the Students' Union, which was later to become the University of Limerick Students' Union.

In its early years, all officers served in a voluntary capacity. The first full-time president was elected in 1975. The National College of Physical Eductation (NCPE), subsequently Thomond College of Education, had a separate students' union, also founded in 1972, until its amalgamation with the university.

Union of Students in Ireland
From its inception in 1972, the union had been involved with the Union of Students in Ireland (USI). In 1991, ULSU withdrew from USI after it decided that the national union was no longer doing what it should be doing for ordinary students on the ground. ULSU has never reaffiliated to USI, although an inquorate referendum held in 2001 on the issue indicated some support among students for such a move. The votes cast in that referendum showed that just under 55 percent of students who voted were in favour of rejoining, but 66 percent in favour would have been needed to pass the referendum, and the referendum anyway did not have enough votes cast to be valid (only 700 against a requirement of 20 percent, changed to 15 percent in 2006).

Re-branding 
In July 2018, the union underwent a re-brand to "UL Student Life". This re-brand was spearheaded by the 2017/2018 executive with a view to increasing student participation.

However this re-brand faced criticism from both past and present students and raised questions about the democratic process within the union. Under the union's constitution, name changes must be approved by a college-wide referendum or an AGM, where the quorum is 100 students. 25 members were in attendance when the name change was proposed with only 3 voting against the proposed re-brand. The re-brand also attracted controversy due to the high costs involved. A former vice-president of the Postgraduate Students' Union cited costs of between €20,000 and €25,000 for development of the brand by an outside company alone. As of 2018, additional costs associated with the re-brand were not known.

Publications

The organisation produces a newspaper, An Focal. The production of An Focal was formerly the responsibility of the vice-president/communications officer. Following the abolition of this office in 2012, a full-time student editor was appointed. The editor is assisted by an editorial team of student volunteers as well as student contributors. The paper's print schedule was up until December 2017 fortnightly before the union decided to change it to monthly, without consulting the editor. A spokesperson for the union cited that the paper had "deteriorated considerably in terms of layout, spelling, grammar, use of colour and overall design".

Organisation and services

The Students' Union in UL has two main differences from some other Students' Unions:

 There is a separate Postgraduate Students Union to represent postgraduate students on postgraduate issues only. Postgraduate students elect a full-time sabbatical President and a part-time Vice-President/Treasurer for the PSU.
 It supports the running of a range of clubs and societies through the UL Wolves brand and administrative superstructure, with a separate executive committee, and two elected reps delegated to the Union Executive. These bodies are administered through the union by and for the students. As of 2018, ULSU supported 37 clubs and 45 societies.

References

External links
 UL Student Life website

Students' unions in Ireland
University of Limerick